Connie Laliberte (born October 21, 1960) is a Canadian curler from Manitoba and world champion.

In 2019, Laliberte was named the tenth greatest Canadian curler in history in a TSN poll of broadcasters, reporters and top curlers.

Championships
Laliberte became world champion in 1984 as skip for the Canadian team.

She won the 1984, 1992 and 1995 Scott Tournament of Hearts, and reached the final in 1994, finishing second. She was selected as skip on the tournament's All-Star team in 1994, and again in 2000 when her team finished third.

References

External links
 
 Connie Laliberte – Curling Canada Stats Archive

1960 births
Living people
Canadian women curlers
World curling champions
Curlers from Winnipeg
Canadian women's curling champions
Canadian twins
Twin sportspeople